Hubert Hurkacz defeated Benjamin Bonzi in the final, 6–3, 7–6(7–4) to win the men's singles tennis title at the 2023 Open 13. He saved a match point en route to the title, against Mikael Ymer in the quarterfinals.

Andrey Rublev was the reigning champion, but chose to compete in Doha instead.

Seeds
The top four seeds received a bye into the second round.

Draw

Finals

Top half

Bottom half

Qualifying

Seeds

Qualifiers

Qualifying draw

First qualifier

Second qualifier

Third qualifier

Fourth qualifier

References

External links
 Main draw
 Qualifying draw

Open 13 Provence - Singles
2023 Singles